Facundo Cangiani (born 23 April 1991) is an Argentine handball player. He plays for MMT Balonmano Zamora and competed for the Argentine national team at the 2015 World Men's Handball Championship in Qatar and 2017 World Men's Handball Championship in France

References

1991 births
Living people
Argentine male handball players
21st-century Argentine people